The Blacker the Berry may refer to:

The Blacker the Berry (novel), a 1929 novel by Wallace Thurman
"The Blacker the Berry" (song), a 2015 song by Kendrick Lamar
 A line from the song "Run and Tell That" from the musical Hairspray
 A line from the song "Black" by Dave
 A line from the Fannie Flagg novel Fried Green Tomatoes at the Whistle Stop Cafe, which was likely referring to the Thurman novel. 
 Pam Grier, as Foxy Brown, famously says in the 1974 film of the same name, "The darker the berry, the sweeter the juice, honey."
"Keep Ya Head Up" (song), a 1993 song by Tupac Shakur.